Aleksandra Melzacka (born 5 May 1998) is a Polish sailor. She competed in the 49er FX event at the 2020 Summer Olympics.

References

External links
 
 

1998 births
Living people
Polish female sailors (sport)
Olympic sailors of Poland
Sailors at the 2020 Summer Olympics – 49er FX
Sportspeople from Gdynia